Futurama is an American animated science fiction sitcom created by Matt Groening. 

Futurama may also refer to:

Futurama (New York World's Fair), an exhibit/ride at the 1939 New York World's Fair
Futurama (Be-Bop Deluxe album), 1975
Futurama (Supercar album), a 2000 album from the Japanese rock group Supercar
Futurama (video game), a 2003 3D platform game based on the science fiction cartoon series
A United Kingdom guitar brand, known as "Kent" in the United States